Asr ( Radar) is an Iranian passive electronically scanned array  long-range radar unveiled in 2013.
The radar is jointly designed and built by the Islamic Republic of Iran Navy and the Ministry of Defence and Armed Forces Logistics (Iran).

Specifications 
The indigenous ASR naval radar uses a passive electronically scanned array, which can be deployed on shore or on ships, making it less vulnerable to anti-radar missiles that use radar signals to home in on their target.

Ceremony 
The "Asr" radar was unveiled at a ceremony attended by Deputy Supreme Commander of the Islamic Republic of Iran and the Islamic Republic of Iran Navy commander in 2013.

References 

Military radars of Iran